History of the Crusades may refer to:
the historiography of the Crusades
Voltaire, Histoire des Croisades (1750, 1751)
Charles Mills, History of the Crusades for the Recovery and Possession of the Holy Land (1820)
Joseph François Michaud, Histoire des Croisades (1811-1840)
René Grousset, L'Histoire des croisades et du royaume franc de Jérusalem, 3 vols.  (1934–1936)
Steven Runciman, A History of the Crusades (1951-54);
Christopher Tyerman, God's War: A New History of the Crusades (2006).